Sir Theodore Morris Sugden FRS, (31 December 1919 – 3 January 1984) was a British chemist who specialised in combustion research.

Biography

Theodore Morris Sugden (Morris) was born in the village of Triangle, the only child of Florence (née Chadwick) and Frederick Morris Sugden, a clerk in a mill. After attending Sowerby Bridge and District Secondary School he gained an open scholarship to Jesus College, Cambridge in 1938, where he read chemistry and was awarded a First in 1940.  That year he began research under physicist W C Price on the measurement of precise ionization potentials of molecules. He later switched to working with R G W Norrish for war-work on the suppression of gun flash.

Sugden’s later research activities were in the fields of flame studies, flame photometry, ionization in flames, and microwave spectroscopy.

Appointments

 University Demonstrator in Physical Chemistry, 1946
 Humphrey Owen Jones Lecturer in Physical Chemistry, 1950
 Reader in Physical Chemistry, 1960
 Director of Research at the Shell Thornton Research Centre, near Chester, 1964
 Director of Thornton Research Centre, 1967
 Chief Executive of Shell Research Limited, 1974-1975
 Master of Trinity Hall, Cambridge, 1976

Awards and honours

 Elected to the Royal Society, 1963
 Awarded an honorary D Tech. by University of Bradford, 1967
 Awarded an honorary doctorate of science by York University, Ontario, 1973
 Made a CBE, 1975
 Received the Davy Medal, 1975
 Awarded an honorary doctorate of science by University of Liverpool, 1977
 Awarded an honorary doctorate of science by University of Leeds, 1978
 He was an Honorary Fellow of Jesus and Queens' Colleges, Cambridge.
 Elected a Corresponding Member of the Göttingen Academy of Sciences and Humanities, 1975.
 Chairman of the Combustion Institute Committee, 1970–1982, and an International Vice-President, 1974–1982.
 President of the Chemical Society, 1978-1979
 Physical Secretary of the Royal Society, 1978-1984
 Knighted in the New Year Honours List, 1983

Family

Sugden married Marian Florence Cotton in 1945. They had one child, Andrew Morris, born in 1954. He graduated from Oxford in Botany in 1975, and later gained a doctorate in tropical rainforest ecology. He undertook an expedition to the Serranía de Macuira in northern Colombia, publishing a checklist to the plants of this area along with Enrique Forero. He has subsequently followed an editorial career.

Sir Theodore Morris Sugden died at Addenbrooke's Hospital, Cambridge on 3 January 1984; he was cremated in Cambridge on the 10th. The Sugden Award for combustion research is named in his honour.

Lady Marian Sugden died in December 2009.

References

1919 births
1984 deaths
Fellows of Queens' College, Cambridge
Fellows of the Royal Society
British chemists
Masters of Trinity Hall, Cambridge